The Interagency Autism Coordinating Committee (IACC) is a United States federal advisory panel within the Department of Health and Human Services (HHS). It coordinates all efforts within HHS concerning autism spectrum disorder (ASD).

The IACC was established in 2000, and was reauthorized and chartered as a federal advisory committee since 2006. It is subject to periodic reauthorization.

Mission
The IACC's primary objective is to monitor autism research and associated services and support activities throughout all federal departments and agencies, ensuring that efforts are not duplicative and that they benefit from cross-collaborative opportunities. The IACC advises the Secretary of HHS in advances of ASD research. Specific research includes causes, prevention, treatment, early screening, diagnosis guidelines, interventions, and access to support for individuals with autism. Additional functions of the IACC are to increase public understanding of member agencies' activities and research, and to act as a public forum to discuss autism spectrum disorder-related matters.

An annual update summarizing advances is submitted to Congress and the President. The annual update has been published online every year since 2007. The IACC report of 2016 activities was released in April 2017.

GAO recommendations

The IACC Strategic Plan is released periodically, with the newest update since 2013 expected in the fall of 2017. A November 2013 study of federal autism activities by the U.S. General Accounting Office found that better data and more coordination was needed, with specific recommendations for IACC, including annual updates of the IACC strategic plan.  Samantha Crane, an IACC board member, confirmed that none of the eight objectives that the IACC identified for research on autistic adult issues were fulfilled in 2013.

In 2017, the GAO noted that the IACC has not collaborated with agencies outside the Department of Health and Human Services to support research for transition-age youth with ASD.  They stated "As a result, IACC may continue to miss opportunities to leverage the knowledge of other agencies."

Membership and administration
The Committee includes both federal and public members. Federal officials are selected from government agencies that work on autism related issues. Public members include advocates, community providers, and researchers. There are 31 IACC members, three of whom are autistic.

IACC activities and associated cross-agency programs, policies and research are coordinated and managed by the Office of Autism Research Coordination (OARC).

Jonathan Mitchell, an autistic advocate, has criticized the IACC's nomination process by claiming that it is too biased towards neurodiversity.  He points out that seven pro-neurodiversity, anti-cure autistics were appointed. Two anti-neurodiversity pro-cure autistics were nominated but turned down.  Jonathan Rose, a history professor at Drew University, agreed with his commentary that neurodiversity viewpoints are over-represented at the IACC.

Member agencies
IACC member agencies within HHS are:

 Administration for Community Living
 Agency for Healthcare Resources and Quality (AHRQ)
 Centers for Medicare and Medicaid Services (CMS)
 Centers for Disease Control and Prevention (CDC)
 Food and Drug Administration (FDA)
 Health Resources and Services Administration 
 National Institutes of Health (NIH)

Member agencies external to HHS are the U.S. Department of Defense and U.S. Department of Education.

Further reading

 Decoteau, C. L., & Daniel, M. (2020). Scientific Hegemony and the Field of Autism. American Sociological Review.

References

External links

Autism-related organizations in the United States
United States Department of Health and Human Services agencies
2000 establishments in the United States